A perm is a unit of permeance or "water vapor transmission" given a certain differential in partial pressures on either side of a material or membrane.

Definitions
U.S. perm
The U.S. perm is defined as 1 grain of water vapor per hour, per square foot, per inch of mercury.

{|
|-
|1 U.S. perm 
|= 0.659045  metric perms
|-
|||≈ 57.2135 ng·s−1·m−2·Pa−1
|}

Metric perm
The metric perm (not an SI unit) is defined as 1 gram of water vapor per day, per square meter, per millimeter of mercury. 

{|
|-
|1 metric perm 
|= 1.51735 US perms
|-
|||≈ 86.8127 ng·s−1·m−2·Pa−1
|}

Equivalent SI unit
The equivalent SI measure is the nanogram per second per square meter per pascal.

{|
|-
|1 ng·s−1·m−2·Pa−1 
|≈ 0.0174784 US perms
|-
|||≈ 0.0115191 metric perms
|}
The base normal SI unit for permeance is the kilogram per second per square meter per pascal.
{|
|-
|1 kg·s−1·m−2·Pa−1 
|≈ 1.74784x1010   US perms
|-
|||≈ 1.15191x1010  metric perms
|}

German Institute for Standardization unit
A variant of the metric perm is used in DIN Standard 53122, where permeance is also expressed in grams per square meter per day, but at a fixed, "standard" vapor-pressure difference of 17.918 mmHg. This unit is thus 17.918 times smaller than a metric perm, corresponding to about 0.084683 of a U.S. perm.

References
 Michon, Gérard P. (April 29, 2003) "Permeability and permeance". Final Answers: Physics of Gases and Fluids. - accessed August 13, 2007

Customary units of measurement in the United States
Units of measurement